Simon Bainbridge (30 August 1952 – 2 April 2021) was a British composer.  He was also a professor and head of composition at the Royal Academy of Music, London, and visiting professor at the University of Louisville, Kentucky, in the United States.

Biography
Bainbridge was born in London.  He had his first major break with Spirogyra, written in 1970 while he was still a student. This work displays a passion for intricate and sensuous textures that remained the hallmark of Bainbridge's style. He was educated at Highgate School and the Royal College of Music. After graduating from the Royal College of Music, he studied with Gunther Schuller at Tanglewood; his fondness for American culture was occasionally portrayed in works such as Concerto in Moto Perpetuo (1983), which contains echoes of American minimalism, and the be-bop inspired For Miles (1994). In the 1990s, his work took on a new expressive dimension such as in Ad Ora Incerta (1994) which earned him the Grawemeyer Award in 1997.

Bainbridge was head of composition at the Royal Academy of Music from 1999 to 2007, and was one of the first four professors to be appointed in 2000 with the Academy's status as a constituent college of the University of London.

Bainbridge died on 2 April 2021, aged 68, after four years of pain following unsuccessful back surgery.  Bainbridge was married to the English soprano and vocal coach Lynda Richardson, and father to the actress Rebecca Bainbridge. His ashes are interred on the western side of Highgate Cemetery with the ashes of his brother Martyn Bainbridge, a stage set designer.

Career highlights
 1969–1974 – Studied at Royal College of Music, London, then at Tanglewood with Gunther Schuller
 1976–1978 – Forman Fellow in Composition at the University of Edinburgh
 1983–1985 – Composer-in-residence at Southern Arts
 1997 – University of Louisville Grawemeyer Award for Music Composition for Ad Ora Incerta 
 2001 – Appointed head of composition at the Royal Academy of Music
 2002 – Fiftieth birthday events in Cheltenham, Huddersfield and London

Key works
  String Quartet no.1 (1972)
  Viola Concerto (1976)
  Fantasia for Double Orchestra (1984)
 Clarinet Quintet (1993)
 For Miles for trumpet and chamber ensemble (1994)
 Ad Ora Incerta, Four Orchestral Songs from Primo Levi for mezzo-soprano, bassoon and orchestra (1994); poems by Primo Levi
 Four Primo Levi Settings for mezzo-soprano, clarinet, viola and piano (1996); poems by Primo Levi
 Guitar Concerto for guitar and chamber ensemble (1998)
 Chant for amplified chorus and large ensemble (1999)
 Voiles for bassoon and string ensemble (2001)

Selected recordings
 Ad Ora Incerta; Four Primo Levi Settings – NMC D059 
 Herbsttag – USK 1224CD

References

External links
Simon Bainbridge homepage at Wise Music Classical
Simon Bainbridge page at UYMP
 

1952 births
2021 deaths
20th-century classical composers
21st-century classical composers
English classical composers
People educated at Highgate School
Academics of the Royal Academy of Music
Musicians from London
Alumni of the Royal College of Music
Honorary Members of the Royal Academy of Music
University of Louisville faculty
English male classical composers
20th-century English composers
String quartet composers
21st-century English composers
20th-century British male musicians
20th-century British musicians
21st-century British male musicians
Burials at Highgate Cemetery